Juma Selemani Nkamia (born 1 January 1972) is a Tanzanian CCM politician and Member of Parliament for Chemba constituency since 2015.

References

1972 births
Living people
Tanzanian Muslims
Chama Cha Mapinduzi MPs
Deputy government ministers of Tanzania
Tanzanian MPs 2010–2015
Mpwapwa Secondary School alumni
Same Secondary School alumni
Mzumbe Secondary School alumni